Sparganium acaule is a perennial plant found in the United States of America and Canada. This taxon was included within Sparganium emersum by Cook and Nicholls (1986) but was recently resurrected as a distinct species.

References

acaule